Qorqoruk or Qarqoruk or Qareqoruk may refer to:
 Qorqoruk-e Olya
 Qorqoruk-e Sofla